Wilson McNeil Lowry (February 17, 1913 – June 6, 1993) was an American businessman. He served as the vice president of the Ford Foundation. Lowry was honored the Special Tony Award at the 17th Tony Awards. He died in June 1993 of esophageal cancer at his home in Manhattan, New York, at the age of 80.

References 

1913 births
1993 deaths
Place of birth missing
Deaths from esophageal cancer
American businesspeople
American business executives
20th-century American businesspeople
Special Tony Award recipients